Records and statistics of football in Yemen.

Most Successful Teams

Successful Teams

 

Football in Yemen